Said Al-Khatry (born 1947) is an Omani sport shooter. He competed in the 1984 Summer Olympics.

References

1947 births
Living people
Shooters at the 1984 Summer Olympics
Omani male sport shooters
Olympic shooters of Oman